Medno is a settlement on the right bank of the Sava River in central Slovenia, northwest of the capital Ljubljana. It belongs to the City Municipality of Ljubljana. It is part of the traditional region of Upper Carniola and is now included with the rest of the municipality in the Central Slovenia Statistical Region.

In the area known as Na ježah, a Roman period burial ground has been discovered.

References

External links

Medno on Geopedia

Populated places in the City Municipality of Ljubljana
Šentvid District